The 380mm/45 Modèle 1935 gun was a heavy naval gun of the French Navy. It was the largest calibre naval gun ever fielded in French service.

History
The built-up guns were used on the two battleships of the Richelieu class, Richelieu and Jean Bart. They were mounted in quadruple turrets, which allowed mounting all the main battery at the bow, and saved weight on turret armour in the context of the Washington Naval Treaty.

During World War II seven guns were captured by the Germans and three of these were taken to Norway.  It was planned to install them in a coastal battery at Vardaasen (MKB 6./501 Nötteröy), using Bettungsschiessgerüst (Firing platform) C/39 armoured single mounts, but the war ended before the battery became operational. In 1949 the guns were returned to France (in exchange for 3 German 38 cm SKC/34 from "Batterie Todt") where they were then refurbished at Ruelle.

Five guns remain: one is on display at the Arsenal of Brest, under Recouvrance Bridge; another at Lanvéoc at the École Navale; and a third gun survives at Gâvres, near Lorient. Two others are on display, at Ruelle and at La Spezia. The honour room of the École Navale also displays two 380mm shells and tampions.

See also

Weapons of comparable role, performance and era
 381mm / 50 Model 1934 naval gun : Italian equivalent
 38 cm SK C/34 naval gun : German equivalent

Notes

Bibliography

External links

 PIECES LOURDES : 240 et plus.
 NavWeaps.  French 380 mm/45 (14.96") Model 1935.

Naval guns of France
World War II naval weapons
380 mm artillery
Coastal artillery
World War II weapons of France